Bradley Ogden is a Traverse City, Michigan chef who manages Bradley Ogden Hospitality.

Early career
Ogden graduated from the Culinary Institute of America at Hyde Park, New York in 1977 with honors. He was the recipient of the Richard T. Keating Award, given to the student a who most likely succeeds. In 1979, Ogden was hired as a sous chef at the American Restaurant in Kansas City. He worked closely with his friend and mentor James Beard and his consultants Joe Baun and Barbara Kafka, and was promoted to executive chef within six months. Ogden says the greatest influence on his cooking came from his early exposure to fresh Native American foods.

Career
In 1983, Ogden became executive chef at Campton Place hotel. After six years he opened the Lark Creek Inn, a restaurant in Larkspur with his then-wife Jody Ogden and his business partners Michael and Leslye Dellar. There are currently 14 restaurants that the Lark Creek Restaurant Group encompasses.

In 2003, Ogden moved to Las Vegas and opened his restaurant in Caesars Palace with his son Bryan, who is also a chef. This was Ogden's first restaurant that opened outside of California. Both restaurants have since closed. He has appeared on such television programs as the Today Show, Good Morning, America, AM/San Francisco, Dinner at Julia's and Great Chefs of the West series on the Discovery Channel. In 2012, Ogden launched Bradley Ogden Hospitality, a four-pronged business venture seeking to encompass restaurants, consulting, social media and even a boutique resort community. Ogden started Bradley Ogden Hospitality with his son Bryan Ogden and operations specialist Tony Angotti. Bradley Ogden Hospitality (BOH) is composed of three divisions: Restaurant Development, Consulting and Design, and Digital.

Today Chef Bradley Ogden serves as managing partner of Bradley Ogden Hospitality which he founded with his son, Chef Bryan Ogden. The group consists of multiple areas of focus including media, restaurant development, new products and more. Ogden Hospitality opened four restaurants in 2015 including: The Pour Society and Bradley's Fine Diner in Houston, Texas as well as Bradley's Fine Diner, and Bradley's Funky Franks in Menlo Park, California.

Awards and recognition
At home, he has been featured in publications such as Food and Wine, Cooks Illustrated, The Wine Spectator, Gourmet and Life. Television credits include NBC's “The Today Show,” AM/San Francisco, Dinner at Julia's, Good Morning American and the Great Chefs of the West series.

In 2000, Ogden received the honor of Chef of the Year from the Culinary Institute of America. Other awards include “Best California Chef” by the James Beard Foundation and the Silver Palate Award by the International Food Service Manufacturers’ Association in the category for independent restaurants in 2008. In 2004, Bradley at Caesars Palace received "Best New Restaurant" award by the James Beard Foundation.

 Chef of the Year Award, The Culinary Institute of America, 2000 
 Restaurant of the Year, James Beard Foundation, 2004 
 Restaurateur of the Year, Nevada Restaurant Association, 2010
 Best California Chef, James Beard Foundation

Criminal History
In 2008, Ogden was convicted of misdemeanor battery in Las Vegas, Nevada and sentenced to 180 days in jail. The offense was a 2006 attack on his girlfriend, in which he grabbed and pushed her to the floor, and came after previous run-ins with police over violence with the same victim. In 2005 Ogden has been accused of punching his girlfriend and dragging her by her hair.

Personal life 
Ogden currently resides in California. He has three sons; Bryan, Chad (also a chef at a Macau resort) and Cory who is a doctor in Woodland Hills.

Publications
Ogden's first cookbook Bradley Ogden's Breakfast, Lunch and Dinner won the prestigious International Association of Culinary Professionals Award.

Bradley Ogden's Breakfast, Lunch and Dinner (1991)
Holiday Dinners with Bradley Ogden. (2011)

References

Further reading
Mercury News
Houston Culture Map

Living people
American chefs
American male chefs
Culinary Institute of America Hyde Park alumni
James Beard Foundation Award winners
Year of birth missing (living people)